Naturally is the fifth album by American rock band Three Dog Night, released in 1970. It produced two top ten hits: "Joy to the World" (#1 in February 1971) and "Liar" (#7). "One Man Band" reached the top 20 (#19). The only original by the band is the instrumental "Fire Eater".

Track listing

Side one
"I Can Hear You Calling" (Pentti Glan, Roy Kenner, Hugh Sullivan, Domenic Troiano) – 2:56
"One Man Band" (Billy Fox, January Tyme, Thomas Jefferson Kaye) – 2:51
"I'll Be Creeping" (Andy Fraser, Paul Rodgers) – 3:31
"Fire Eater" (Mike Allsup, Jimmy Greenspoon, Joe Schermie, Floyd Sneed) – 3:55
"Can't Get Enough of It" (Jimmy Miller, Steve Winwood) – 2:53

Side two
"Sunlight" (Jesse Colin Young) – 3:48
"Heavy Church" (Alan O'Day) – 3:38
"Liar" (Russ Ballard) – 3:53
"I've Got Enough Heartache" (Mike Kellie, Gary Wright) – 3:59
"Joy to the World" (Hoyt Axton) – 3:40

Personnel
Cory Wells – lead vocals (tracks A3, A5), background vocals
Chuck Negron – lead vocals (tracks B1, B5), background vocals
Danny Hutton – lead vocals (track B3), background vocals 
Mike Allsup – background vocals (track B5), guitar 
Joe Schermie – background vocals (track B5), bass guitar
Floyd Sneed – background vocals (track B5), drums
Jimmy Greenspoon – background vocals (track B5), keyboards

Production
Producer: Richard Podolor
Engineer: Bill Cooper
Arranger: Three Dog Night
Photography: Ed Caraeff
Roadie, lighting: Dennis Albro
Roadie, sound: Lee Carlton

Charts
Album – Billboard (United States)

Singles – Billboard (United States)

Certifications

References

Three Dog Night albums
1970 albums
Albums produced by Richard Podolor
Dunhill Records albums